This is a list of Australian plant species authored by Joseph Maiden, including naturalised species:

 Acacia abrupta Maiden & Blakely
 Acacia acellerata Maiden & Blakely
 Acacia adsurgens Maiden & Blakely
 Acacia alleniana Maiden
 Acacia ancistrocarpa Maiden & Blakely
 Acacia angusta Maiden & Blakely
 Acacia armitii F.Muell. ex Maiden
 Acacia attenuata Maiden & Blakely
 Acacia baeuerlenii Maiden & R.T.Baker
 Acacia bakeri Maiden
 Acacia bancroftiorum Maiden
 Acacia basedowii Maiden
 Acacia betchei Maiden & Blakely
 Acacia blakelyi Maiden
 Acacia boormanii Maiden
 Acacia burrowii Maiden
 Acacia caesiella Maiden & Blakely
 Acacia calcarata Maiden & Blakely
 Acacia cana Maiden
 Acacia carneorum Maiden
 Acacia centrinervia Maiden & Blakely
 Acacia chalkeri Maiden
 Acacia chrysella Maiden & Blakely
 Acacia chrysopoda Maiden & Blakely
 Acacia clunies-rossiae Maiden
 Acacia confluens Maiden & Blakely
 Acacia coolgardiensis Maiden
 Acacia curranii Maiden
 Acacia curvinervia Maiden
 Acacia deflexa Maiden & Blakely
 Acacia desertorum Maiden & Blakely
 Acacia difficilis Maiden
 Acacia dorothea Maiden
 Acacia dunnii (Maiden) Turrill
 Acacia enervia Maiden & Blakely
 Acacia eriopoda Maiden & Blakely
 Acacia excentrica Maiden & Blakely
 Acacia fauntleroyi (Maiden) Maiden & Blakely
 Acacia ferocior Maiden
 Acacia flocktoniae Maiden
 Acacia forsythii Maiden & Blakely
 Acacia fragilis Maiden & Blakely
 Acacia froggattii Maiden
 Acacia gardneri Maiden & Blakely
 Acacia gillii (Maiden) Maiden & Blakely
 Acacia glaucocarpa Maiden & Blakely
 Acacia glutinosissima Maiden & Blakely
 Acacia gracilifolia Maiden & Blakely
 Acacia granitica Maiden
 Acacia grasbyi Maiden
 Acacia hamiltoniana Maiden
 Acacia hammondii Maiden
 Acacia havilandiorum Maiden
 Acacia helmsiana Maiden
 Acacia hemsleyi Maiden
 Acacia hilliana Maiden
 Acacia inophloia Maiden & Blakely
 Acacia inops Maiden & Blakely
 Acacia jennerae Maiden
 Acacia jensenii Maiden
 Acacia jibberdingensis Maiden & Blakely
 Acacia jonesii F.Muell. & Maiden
 Acacia jucunda Maiden & Blakely
 Acacia kettlewelliae Maiden
 Acacia kingiana Maiden & Blakely
 Acacia kybeanensis Maiden & Blakely
 Acacia lentiginea Maiden & Blakely
 Acacia linearifolia Maiden & Blakely
 Acacia loderi Maiden
 Acacia longiphyllodinea Maiden
 Acacia mabellae Maiden
 Acacia macnuttiana Maiden & Blakely
 Acacia malloclada Maiden & Blakely
 Acacia maxwellii Maiden & Blakely
 Acacia merrickiae Maiden & Blakely
 Acacia mollifolia Maiden & Blakely
 Acacia muelleriana Maiden & R.T.Baker
 Acacia nigripilosa Maiden
 Acacia obtecta Maiden & Blakely
 Acacia orbifolia Maiden & Blakely
 Acacia oshanesii F.Muell. & Maiden
 Acacia pachyacra Maiden & Blakely
 Acacia pilligaensis Maiden
 Acacia prainii Maiden
 Acacia proxima Maiden
 Acacia ptychoclada Maiden & Blakely
 Acacia pulviniformis Maiden & Blakely
 Acacia pustula Maiden & Blakely
 Acacia rendlei Maiden
 Acacia rhodoxylon Maiden
 Acacia ruppii Maiden & Betche
 Acacia sedifolia Maiden & Blakely
 Acacia semicircinalis Maiden & Blakely
 Acacia semilunata Maiden & Blakely
 Acacia semirigida Maiden & Blakely
 Acacia sessilispica Maiden & Blakely
 Acacia shirleyi Maiden
 Acacia sparsiflora Maiden
 Acacia steedmanii Maiden & Blakely
 Acacia stowardii Maiden
 Acacia subflexuosa Maiden
 Acacia tenuior Maiden
 Acacia tropica (Maiden & Blakely) Tindale
 Acacia validinervia Maiden & Blakely
 Acacia viscifolia Maiden & Blakely
 Acacia websteri Maiden & Blakely
 Acacia whitei Maiden
 Actinotus forsythii Maiden & Betche
 Alloxylon pinnatum (Maiden & Betche) P.H.Weston & Crisp
 Almaleea cambagei (Maiden & Betche) Crisp & P.H.Weston
 Archidendron muellerianum (Maiden & R.T.Baker) I.C.Nielsen
 Atriplex kochiana Maiden
 Baeckea denticulata Maiden & Betche
 Blechnum norfolkianum (Heward) Maiden
 Boronia deanei Maiden & Betche
 Boronia glabra (Maiden & Betche) Cheel
 Boronia granitica Maiden & Betche
 Boronia repanda (F.Muell. ex Maiden & Betche) Maiden & Betche
 Calotis inermis Maiden & Betche
 Capparis arborea (F.Muell.) Maiden
 Corymbia bloxsomei (Maiden) K.D.Hill & L.A.S.Johnson
 Corymbia gilbertensis (Maiden & Blakely) K.D.Hill & L.A.S.Johnson
 Corymbia haematoxylon (Maiden) K.D.Hill & L.A.S.Johnson
 Cryptocarya erythroxylon Maiden & Betche ex Maiden
 Cryptocarya gregsonii Maiden
 Ctenopteris walleri (Maiden & Betche) S.B.Andrews
 Dodonaea camfieldii Maiden & Betche
 Dodonaea hirsuta (Maiden & Betche) Maiden & Betche
 Endiandra globosa Maiden & Betche
 Epacris hamiltonii Maiden & Betche
 Eriachne glabrata (Maiden) W.Hartley
 Eucalyptus acaciiformis H.Deane & Maiden
 Eucalyptus agglomerata Maiden
 Eucalyptus aggregata H.Deane & Maiden
 Eucalyptus albida Maiden & Blakely
 Eucalyptus andrewsii Maiden
 Eucalyptus approximans Maiden
 Eucalyptus archeri Maiden & Blakely
 Eucalyptus astringens (Maiden) Maiden
 Eucalyptus bakeri Maiden
 Eucalyptus bancroftii (Maiden) Maiden
 Eucalyptus banksii Maiden
 Eucalyptus baxteri (Benth.) Maiden & Blakely ex J.M.Black
 Eucalyptus benthamii Maiden & Cambage
 Eucalyptus blakelyi Maiden
 Eucalyptus blaxlandii Maiden & Cambage
 Eucalyptus brownii Maiden & Cambage
 Eucalyptus burracoppinensis Maiden & Blakely
 Eucalyptus caleyi Maiden
 Eucalyptus cambageana Maiden
 Eucalyptus camfieldii Maiden
 Eucalyptus canaliculata Maiden
 Eucalyptus clelandii (Maiden) Maiden
 Eucalyptus concinna Maiden & Blakely
 Eucalyptus confluens Maiden
 Eucalyptus conglobata (Benth.) Maiden
 Eucalyptus conglomerata Maiden & Blakely
 Eucalyptus conica H.Deane & Maiden
 Eucalyptus consideniana Maiden
 Eucalyptus crucis Maiden
 Eucalyptus cylindriflora Maiden & Blakely
 Eucalyptus dalrympleana Maiden
 Eucalyptus deanei Maiden
 Eucalyptus decorticans (Bailey) Maiden
 Eucalyptus desmondensis Maiden & Blakely
 Eucalyptus dongarraensis Maiden & Blakely
 Eucalyptus dundasii Maiden
 Eucalyptus dunnii Maiden
 Eucalyptus dwyeri Maiden & Blakely
 Eucalyptus ebbanoensis Maiden
 Eucalyptus eremophila (Diels) Maiden
 Eucalyptus ewartiana Maiden
 Eucalyptus fastigata H.Deane & Maiden
 Eucalyptus flocktoniae (Maiden) Maiden
 Eucalyptus fraxinoides H.Deane & Maiden
 Eucalyptus gardneri Maiden
 Eucalyptus gilbertensis (Maiden & Blakely) S.T.Blake
 Eucalyptus gillii Maiden
 Eucalyptus glaucescens Maiden & Blakely
 Eucalyptus grasbyi Maiden & Blakely
 Eucalyptus griffithsii Maiden
 Eucalyptus guilfoylei Maiden
 Eucalyptus haematoxylon Maiden
 Eucalyptus herbertiana Maiden
 Eucalyptus houseana Maiden
 Eucalyptus jacksonii Maiden
 Eucalyptus jensenii Maiden
 Eucalyptus johnstonii Maiden
 Eucalyptus jutsonii Maiden
 Eucalyptus kessellii Maiden & Blakely
 Eucalyptus kingsmillii (Maiden) Maiden & Blakely
 Eucalyptus kitsoniana Maiden
 Eucalyptus kochii Maiden & Blakely
 Eucalyptus kondininensis Maiden & Blakely
 Eucalyptus kybeanensis Maiden & Cambage
 Eucalyptus lane-poolei Maiden
 Eucalyptus lesouefii Maiden
 Eucalyptus lirata W.Fitzg. ex Maiden
 Eucalyptus longicornis (F.Muell.) F.Muell. ex Maiden
 Eucalyptus macarthurii H.Deane & Maiden
 Eucalyptus major (Maiden) Blakely
 Eucalyptus melanoxylon Maiden
 Eucalyptus merrickiae Maiden & Blakely
 Eucalyptus microcarpa (Maiden) Maiden
 Eucalyptus microneura Maiden & Blakely
 Eucalyptus mooreana W.Fitzg. ex Maiden
 Eucalyptus moorei Maiden & Cambage
 Eucalyptus neglecta Maiden
 Eucalyptus nicholii Maiden & Blakely
 Eucalyptus nitens (H.Deane & Maiden) Maiden
 Eucalyptus normantonensis Maiden & Cambage
 Eucalyptus notabilis Maiden
 Eucalyptus nova-anglica H.Deane & Maiden
 Eucalyptus orgadophila Maiden & Blakely
 Eucalyptus ovularis Maiden & Blakely
 Eucalyptus pachycalyx Maiden & Blakely
 Eucalyptus pilligaensis Maiden
 Eucalyptus pimpiniana Maiden
 Eucalyptus platycorys Maiden & Blakely
 Eucalyptus praecox Maiden
 Eucalyptus propinqua H.Deane & Maiden
 Eucalyptus pseudoglobulus Naudin ex Maiden
 Eucalyptus quadrangulata H.Deane & Maiden
 Eucalyptus rigidula Maiden
 Eucalyptus rubida H.Deane & Maiden
 Eucalyptus rudderi Maiden
 Eucalyptus rummeryi Maiden
 Eucalyptus sargentii Maiden
 Eucalyptus scoparia Maiden
 Eucalyptus scyphocalyx (F.Muell. ex Benth.) Maiden & Blakely
 Eucalyptus seeana Maiden
 Eucalyptus sessilis (Maiden) Blakely
 Eucalyptus sheathiana Maiden
 Eucalyptus shirleyi Maiden
 Eucalyptus similis Maiden
 Eucalyptus squamosa H.Deane & Maiden
 Eucalyptus staeri (Maiden) Kessell & C.A.Gardner
 Eucalyptus stowardii Maiden
 Eucalyptus stricklandii Maiden
 Eucalyptus subcrenulata Maiden & Blakely
 Eucalyptus tenuipes (Maiden & Blakely) Blakely & C.T.White
 Eucalyptus transcontinentalis Maiden
 Eucalyptus triflora (Maiden) Blakely
 Eucalyptus umbrawarrensis Maiden
 Eucalyptus websteriana Maiden
 Eucalyptus whitei Maiden & Blakely
 Eucalyptus woodwardii Maiden
 Eucalyptus yarraensis Maiden & Cambage
 Eucalyptus yilgarnensis (Maiden) Brooker
 Euryomyrtus denticulata (Maiden & Betche) Trudgen
 Goodenia dimorpha Maiden & Betche
 Goodenia glomerata Maiden & Betche
 Goodenia havilandii Maiden & Betche
 Hakea bakeriana F.Muell. & Maiden
 Haloragodendron lucasii (Maiden & Betche) Orchard
 Helichrysum boormanii Maiden & Betche
 Hibbertia elata Maiden & Betche
 Homoranthus darwinioides (Maiden & Betche) Cheel
 Hymenophyllum walleri Maiden & Betche
 Isolepis australiensis (Maiden & Betche) K.L.Wilson
 Kunzea bracteolata Maiden & Betche
 Kunzea cambagei Maiden & Betche
 Lasiopetalum longistamineum Maiden & Betche
 Leptochloa decipiens (R.Br.) Maiden
 Leptospermum macrocarpum (Maiden & Betche) Joy Thomps.
 Leptospermum rotundifolium (Maiden & Betche) F.Rodway ex Cheel
 Leucopogon fletcheri Maiden & Betche
 Macadamia integrifolia Maiden & Betche
 Melaleuca alternifolia Maiden & Betche ex Cheel
 Micromyrtus hexamera (Maiden & Betche) Maiden & Betche
 Olearia flocktoniae Maiden & Betche
 Olearia microphylla (Vent.) Maiden & Betche
 Ozothamnus tesselatus (Maiden & R.T.Baker) Anderb.
 Pandorea baileyana (Maiden & R.T.Baker) Steenis
 Parsonsia rotata Maiden & Betche
 Phebalium nottii (F.Muell.) Maiden & Betche
 Phebalium stenophyllum (Benth.) Maiden & Betche
 Plantago hedleyi Maiden
 Podolepis robusta (Maiden & Betche) J.H.Willis
 Polycarpaea holtzei Maiden & Betche
 Prasophyllum fitzgeraldii R.S.Rogers & Maiden
 Prostanthera granitica Maiden & Betche
 Prostanthera teretifolia Maiden & Betche
 Pultenaea campbellii Maiden & Betche
 Pultenaea luehmannii Maiden
 Pultenaea vrolandii Maiden
 Pultenaea williamsonii Maiden
 Rapanea sp. Richmond River (J.H.Maiden & J.L.Boorman NSW 26751) NSW Herbarium
 Rhodanthe microglossa (Maiden & Betche) Paul G.Wilson
 Rulingia procumbens Maiden & Betche
 Rulingia prostrata Maiden & Betche
 Rupicola sprengelioides Maiden & Betche
 Spartothamnella puberula (F.Muell.) Maiden & Betche
 Swainsona bracteata (Maiden & Betche) Joy Thomps.
 Themeda avenacea (F.Muell.) Maiden & Betche
 Uranthoecium truncatum (Maiden & Betche) Stapf
 Westringia cheelii Maiden & Betche
 Zieria robusta Maiden & Betche

Authored, Maiden, Joseph